Events from the year 1951 in the United States.

Incumbents

Federal Government 
 President: Harry S. Truman (D-Missouri)
 Vice President: Alben W. Barkley (D-Kentucky)
 Chief Justice: Fred M. Vinson (Kentucky)
 Speaker of the House of Representatives: Sam Rayburn (D-Texas)
 Senate Majority Leader: Scott W. Lucas (D-Illinois) (until January 3), Ernest McFarland (D-Arizona) (starting January 3)
 Congress: 81st (until January 3), 82nd (starting January 3)

Events

January–March
 January 1 – First week of Patti Page's hit song "Tennessee Waltz" as No. 1 single on Billboard and Cashbox charts.
 January 10 – The new United Nations headquarters officially opens in New York City.
 January 17 – Korean War: Chinese and North Korean forces capture Seoul.
 January 27 – Nuclear testing at the Nevada Test Site begins with a 1-kiloton bomb dropped on Frenchman Flat, northwest of Las Vegas.
 January 31 – The last daily narrow gauge passenger train, the San Juan Express, is retired by the Denver and Rio Grande Western Railroad.
 February 21 – The Jack in the Box fast-food restaurant chain is founded by Robert O. Peterson in San Diego, California.
 February 27 – The Twenty-second Amendment to the United States Constitution, limiting presidents to two terms, is ratified.
 March 12 – Hank Ketcham's best-selling comic strip Dennis the Menace appears in newspapers across the U.S. for the first time.
 March 14 – Korean War: For the second time, United Nations troops recapture Seoul.
 March 29
Ethel and Julius Rosenberg are convicted of conspiracy to commit espionage. On April 5 they are sentenced to receive the death penalty.
Rodgers and Hammerstein's The King and I opens on Broadway and runs for three years. It is the first Rodgers & Hammerstein musical specifically written for an actress (Gertrude Lawrence). Lawrence is stricken with cancer during the run of the show and dies halfway through its run a year later. The show makes a star of Yul Brynner.
The 23rd Academy Awards ceremony, hosted by Fred Astaire, is held at RKO Pantages Theatre in Hollywood, Los Angeles. Joseph L. Mankiewicz's All About Eve wins six awards, including Best Motion Picture and Mankiewicz's second consecutive Best Director win. The film is also nominated for 14 awards overall, breaking the record of 13 set by 1939's Gone with the Wind.
 March 31 – Remington Rand delivers the first UNIVAC I computer to the United States Census Bureau.

April–June

 April 7 – Operation Greenhouse: The first thermonuclear burn is carried out on Enewetak Atoll in the Marshall Islands of the Pacific by the U.S. Three further tests in this series take place up to May 24.
 April 11 – U.S. President Harry S. Truman relieves General Douglas MacArthur of his Far Eastern commands.
 May 3 – The U.S. Senate Committee on Armed Services and U.S. Senate Committee on Foreign Relations begins its closed door hearings into the dismissal of General Douglas MacArthur by U.S. President Harry S. Truman.
 May 21 – The Ninth Street Show, formally known as the 9th Street Art Exhibition, a gathering of a number of notable artists, marks the stepping-out of the post war New York avant-garde, collectively known as the New York School.
 June 14 – The UNIVAC I computer is dedicated by the U.S. Census Bureau.
 June 15–July 1 – In New Mexico, Arizona, California, Oregon, Washington and British Columbia, thousands of hectares of forests are destroyed in fires.
 June 18 – Battle Ground, Washington is incorporated.

July–September

 July 10 – Korean War: Armistice negotiations begin at Kaesong.
 July 11–12 – Cicero race riot of 1951: A mob of 4,000 whites attack an apartment building housing a single black family in a neighborhood in Cicero, Illinois.
 July 13
The Great Flood of 1951 reaches its highest point in Northeast Kansas, culminating in the greatest flood damage to date in the Midwestern United States.
MGM's Technicolor film version of Show Boat, starring Kathryn Grayson, Ava Gardner, and Howard Keel, premieres at Radio City Music Hall in New York City. The musical brings overnight fame to African American bass-baritone William Warfield (who sings Ol' Man River in the film).
 July 14 – In Joplin, Missouri, the George Washington Carver National Monument becomes the first United States National Monument to honor an African American.
 July 16 – J. D. Salinger's coming-of-age story The Catcher in the Rye is published by Little, Brown and Company in New York City.
 July 17 – Western New England College in Springfield, Massachusetts is chartered.
 July 26 – Walt Disney's 13th animated feature film, Alice in Wonderland, premieres in London, United Kingdom. Though the film is not well received critically upon release, it later garners more acclaim from the psychedelic era onwards as a cult classic.
 July 30 – David Lean's Oliver Twist is finally shown in the United States, after 10 minutes of supposedly anti-Semitic references and closeups of Alec Guinness as Fagin are cut. It will not be shown uncut in the U.S. until 1970.
 September 1 – The United States, Australia and New Zealand all sign a mutual defense pact, called the ANZUS Treaty.
 September 3 – The American soap opera Search for Tomorrow debuts on CBS. The show switches to NBC on March 26, 1982 and airs its final episode on December 26, 1986.
 September 8 
Treaty of San Francisco: In San Francisco, 48 nations sign a peace treaty with Japan to formally end the Pacific War.
Japan-U.S. Security Treaty, which allows United States Armed Forces being stationed in Japan after the occupation of Japan, is signed by Japan and the United States.
 September 18 – Tennessee Williams's film adaptation of A Streetcar Named Desire premieres, becoming a critical and box-office smash.
 September 20 – NATO accepts Greece and Turkey as members.

October–December

 October 3 – "Shot Heard 'Round the World": One of the greatest moments in Major League Baseball history occurs when the New York Giants' Bobby Thomson hits a game winning home run in the bottom of the 9th inning off of Brooklyn Dodgers pitcher Ralph Branca, to win the National League pennant after being down 14 games.
 October 4 
MGM's Technicolor musical film, An American in Paris, starring Gene Kelly and Leslie Caron and directed by Vincente Minnelli, premieres in New York. It will go on to win six Academy Awards, including Best Picture.
Shoppers World (one of the first shopping malls in the U.S.) opens in Framingham, Massachusetts.
 October 10 – The New York Yankees defeat the New York Giants (baseball), 4 games to 2, to win the 14th World Series Title.
 October 15 – Sitcom I Love Lucy, starring Lucille Ball and her husband Desi Arnaz, makes its television debut on CBS.
 October 16 – Judy Garland begins her legendary concerts in New York's Palace Theatre (Broadway).
 October 17 – CBS' Eye logo premieres on television.
 October 20 – The "Johnny Bright incident", an assault on an African American player, occurs in a college football game at Stillwater, Oklahoma.
 October 24 – U.S. President Harry Truman declares an official end to war with Germany.
 November 1 – The first military exercises for nuclear warfare, with infantry troops included, are held in the Nevada desert.
 November 10 – Direct dial coast-to-coast telephone service begins.
 November 22 – Paramount Pictures releases George Pal science fiction film When Worlds Collide.
 November 24 – The Broadway play Gigi opens, starring little known actress Audrey Hepburn as the lead character.
 November 28 – The film Scrooge, starring Alastair Sim, premieres in the U.S. under the title of Charles Dickens's original novel, A Christmas Carol.
 c. December – The Institute of War and Peace Studies is established by Dwight D. Eisenhower at Columbia University in New York (of which he is President) with William T. R. Fox as first director.
 December 13 – A water storage tank collapses in Tucumcari, New Mexico, resulting in 4 deaths and 200 buildings destroyed.
 December 17 – "We Charge Genocide", a petition describing genocide by the U.S. government against African Americans, is delivered to the United Nations.
 December 20 – Experimental Breeder Reactor I (EBR-1), the world's first (experimental) nuclear power plant, opens in Idaho.
 December 23 – John Huston's drama film, The African Queen, starring Humphrey Bogart and Katharine Hepburn, premieres in Hollywood.
 December 24 – Gian Carlo Menotti's 45-minute opera Amahl and the Night Visitors premieres live on NBC, becoming the first opera written especially for television.
 December 31 – The Marshall Plan expires after distributing more than US$13.3 billion in foreign aid to rebuild Europe.

Ongoing
 Cold War (1947–1991)
 Second Red Scare (1947–1957)
 Marshall Plan (1948–1951)
 Korean War (1950–1953)

Unknown
"Vegas Vic" is added to the Pioneer Club, in Las Vegas.

Births

January–March

 January 1 – Martha P. Haynes, astronomer and academic
 January 2 – Jim Essian, baseball player and coach
 January 4
 Bob Black, author and activist
 Barbara Cochran, skier
 January 6 – Kim Wilson, singer, harmonica player
 January 8 – John McTiernan, director, producer and writer
 January 9 – John Prados, historian and war gamer designer (d. 2022)
 January 11 – Carol Leigh, author and sex workers' rights activist (d. 2022)
 January 12 
 Kirstie Alley, actress (d. 2022)
 Chris Bell, guitarist and singer-songwriter (d. 1978)
 Rush Limbaugh, conservative radio personality (d. 2021)
 January 18 – Elijah Cummings, African American politician (d. 2019)
 January 21 – Eric Holder, African American politician, 82nd United States Attorney General
 January 22 
 Alveda King, activist, minister, author and politician
 Leon Roberts, baseball player
 January 23 
 Margaret Bailes, sprinter
 Michael R. Matz, horse rider and trainer
 Sully Sullenberger, airline captain
 January 25 – Steve Prefontaine, runner (d. 1975)
 January 27 
 Seth Justman, rock keyboardist (The J. Geils Band)
 Ken Timbs, wrestler (d. 2004)
 January 30 – Charles S. Dutton, African American actor
 January 31
 Dave Benton, Aruban-born American singer
 Harry Wayne Casey, musician, songwriter and producer

 February 4 – Phil Ehart, drummer (Kansas)
 February 5 – O'Neal Compton, actor and director (d. 2019)
 February 7 – Kim Milford, actor and singer (d. 1988)
 February 9 – Jay Inslee, politician
 February 10 – Bob Iger, CEO of The Walt Disney Company
 February 12 – Cory Lerios, pianist and vocalist  
 February 13 – David Naughton, actor (Makin' It) ***
 February 15 – Melissa Manchester, pop singer
 February 16
 Mike Flanagan, baseball pitcher (died 2011)
 William Katt, film, television actor (The Greatest American Hero)
 February 19 – Alan Merrill, musician (died 2020)  
 February 20 – Edward Albert, film and television actor (died 2006)
 February 22 – Ellen Greene, actress
 February 23 – Patricia Richardson, actress
 February 24 – Debra Jo Rupp, actress (That 70's Show)
 February 27 – Lee Atwater, political activist, campaign strategist and presidential advisor (d. 1991)

 March 1 – Deb Fischer, politician
 March 4
 Mike Quarry, light-heavyweight boxer (died 2006)
 Gwen Welles, actress (died 1993)
 March 8 – Dianne Walker, tap dancer
 March 14 – Jerry Greenfield, co-founder of Ben & Jerry's ice cream
 March 17 – Kurt Russell, actor
 March 18
 Ben Cohen, co-founder of Ben & Jerry's ice cream
 B. E. Taylor, singer (d. 2016)
 March 19 – Fred Berry, actor (d. 2003)
 March 24 – Tommy Hilfiger, fashion designer
 March 26 – Carl Wieman, physicist, Nobel Prize laureate

April–June
 April 1 
 Tim Bassett, basketball player (died 2018)
 Frederic Schwartz, American architect, co-designed Empty Sky (died 2014)
 April 5 – Dean Kamen, inventor, entrepreneur
 April 7 – Janis Ian, folk singer-songwriter
 April 8 – Phil Schaap, radio host (d. 2021)
 April 10 – David Helvarg, journalist, activist
 April 11 – Doris Angleton, socialite, murder victim (d. 1997)
 April 12 
 Alex Briley, disco singer
 Tom Noonan, film actor
 April 13
 Peabo Bryson, African American R&B singer-songwriter
 John Furey, screen actor
 Max Weinberg, rock drummer
 April 16
 Mordechai Ben David, Hasidic Jewish singer
 Bill Walker, 13th Governor of Alaska
 April 20 – Luther Vandross, African American R&B, soul singer-songwriter (d. 2005)
 April 21
 Tony Danza, actor, comedian (Who's the Boss?)
 Bob Varsha, sportscaster
 April 23 – Allison Krause, Kent State University shooting victim (d. 1970)
 April 27 – Ace Frehley, rock guitarist (Kiss)
 April 29 – Dale Earnhardt, race car driver (d. 2001 in auto racing accident)
 May 3
Christopher Cross, pop rock singer-songwriter ("Sailing")
 Stewart F. Lane, Broadway producer, director, playwright and actor
 May 4 – Jackie Jackson, African American pop singer (The Jackson 5)
 May 9 – Joy Harjo, Native American poet
 May 12 – Joe Nolan, baseball player
 May 13 
 Sharon Sayles Belton, Mayor of Minneapolis
 Guy Morriss, American football coach and player (d. 2022)
 May 14 – Robert Zemeckis, film director, producer and screenwriter
 May 15
 Jonathan Richman, proto-punk singer-songwriter and guitarist
 Frank Wilczek, physicist, Nobel Prize laureate
 May 19
 Joey Ramone, rock musician (Ramones) (d. 2001)
 Dick Slater, professional wrestler (d. 2018)
 May 20 – Mike Crapo, U.S. Senator from Idaho from 1999
  May 21
 Al Franken, comedian (Saturday Night Live) and U.S. Senator from Minnesota from 2009 to 2018
 Bob Gale, film screenwriter, producer and director
 May 23 – Jill E. Barad, businessperson
 May 26 – Sally Ride, First American woman astronaut (d. 2012)
 May 30
 Garrett Hongo, poet
 Stephen Tobolowsky, screen actor
 May 31 – Jimmy Nalls, jazz fusion guitarist (Sea Level) (d. 2017)
 June 2 
Gilbert Baker, artist and activist, creator of the Rainbow flag in 1978 (d. 2017)
Jeanine Pirro, attorney, politician and conservative political commentator
 June 3 
 Jill Biden, First Lady of the United States
 Deniece Williams, African-American singer
 June 5 – Suze Orman, financial advisor, writer and television personality
 June 8 –  Tony Rice, bluegrass musician (d. 2020)
 June 9 
 Bruce Duffy, author (d. 2022)
 James Newton Howard, film composer
 June 12 – Brad Delp, rock vocalist (Boston) (d. 2007)
 June 13 – Richard Thomas, television actor (The Waltons)
 June 15 – Jane Amsterdam, magazine editor
 June 16 – Charlie Dominici, progressive metal singer
 June 18 – Steve Miner, screen director and producer
 June 20 – Tress MacNeille, voice actress
 June 21 – Nils Lofgren, rock musician
 June 24
 Leslie Cochran, homeless activist and Austin icon (d. 2012)
 Ken Reitz, baseball player (d. 2021)
 June 27 – Julia Duffy, actress
 June 28 – Lloyd Maines, country musician, record producer
 June 29
 Keno Don Rosa, comic book author
 Craig Sager, sports commentator (d. 2016)
 June 30 – Stanley Clarke, jazz fusion bass guitarist

July–September
 July 1
 Daryl Anderson, television actor
 Anne Feeney, folk singer (d. 2021)
 Terrence Mann, actor and dancer
 July 2
 Anne Garrels, journalist (d. 2022)
 Keith Marshall, baseball player
 Sylvia Rivera, transgender activist (d. 2002)
 Stevie Woods, R&B singer (d. 2014)
 July 3 – Bob Rigby, soccer goalkeeper
 July 4 – Vincent Marzello, screen actor (d. 2020)
 July 5 
 Goose Gossage, baseball player
 Roger Wicker, politician
 July 7 – Roz Ryan, actress and voice actress
 July 8 – Anjelica Huston, screen actress
 July 9 – Chris Cooper, screen actor
 July 10
 Phyllis Smith, screen and voice actress
 Cheryl Wheeler, folk singer-songwriter
 July 11 – Yechiel Eckstein, rabbi (d. 2019)
 July 12 – Cheryl Ladd, actress and singer
 July 17 – Lucie Arnaz, actress and singer
 July 21 – Robin Williams, actor and comedian (d. 2014)
 July 22 – Tisa Farrow, film actress
 July 23 – Michael McConnohie, voice actor
 July 24 – Lynda Carter, actress and singer
 July 25 – Angela Jackson, African American poet and playwright
 July 28
 Doug Collins, basketball player, coach and analyst
 Garrett Hongo, poet
 July 31 – Barry Van Dyke, actor, writer, director and presenter
 August 2 – Andrew Gold, pop singer-songwriter and multi-instrumentalist (10cc, Wax) (d. 2011)
 August 3 – Jay North, child and adult television and voice actor
 August 6 – Catherine Hicks, television actress
 August 8 – Randy Shilts, journalist and author (d. 1994)
 August 12 – Willie Horton, criminal
 August 13 – Dan Fogelberg, singer-songwriter and multi-instrumentalist (d. 2007)
 August 14 – Carl Lumbly, African American screen and voice actor
 August 15 – Bobby Caldwell, singer-songwriter and multi-instrumentalist (d. 2023)
 August 17 – Richard Hunt, puppeteer (d. 1992)
 August 20 – Greg Bear, science fiction author
 August 21
 Chesley V. Morton, politician and securities arbitrator
 Harry Smith, television journalist and editor
 John Stearns, baseball player (d. 2022)
 August 23
 Allan Bristow, basketball player and coach
 Mark Hudson, record producer
 Jimi Jamison, rock singer-songwriter (Survivor) (d. 2014)
 Susan L. Solomon, executive and lawyer (d. 2022)
 August 24 
 Orson Scott Card, science fiction author
 Bill C. Davis, playwright and actor (d. 2021)
 August 26 – Edward Witten, mathematician, Fields medalist
 August 27
 Mack Brown, college football coach
 Robert Torricelli, U.S. Senator from New Jersey from 1997 to 2003
 August 28
 Barbara Hambly, novelist and screenwriter
 Wayne Osmond, pop singer
 August 30 – Timothy Bottoms, film actor
 September 2
 Jim DeMint, U.S. Senator from South Carolina
 Mark Harmon, screen actor
 September 4 – Judith Ivey, stage actress and director
 September 5 – Michael Keaton, screen actor and director
 September 7
 Chrissie Hynde, rock singer
 Bert Jones, football player
 September 11 – Mr. Butch, homeless person and Boston icon (d. 2007)
 September 12 – Joe Pantoliano, screen character actor
 September 13
 Suzanne Lummis, poet
 Jean Smart, actress (Designing Women)
 Linda Wong, pornographic film actress (d. 1987)
 September 15
 Pete Carroll, football coach
 Jared Taylor, author and journalist
 Fred Seibert, screen producer, Frederator Studios founder
 September 17 – Cassandra Peterson, screen actress (Elvira, Mistress of the Dark)
 September 18
 Ben Carson, African American politician, author and neurosurgeon
 Dee Dee Ramone, rock bass guitarist (Ramones) (d. 2002)
 Darryl Stingley, American football player (New England Patriots) (d. 2007)
 September 22 – Amanda Mackey, casting director (d. 2022)
 September 25
 Pedro Almodóvar, filmmaker
 Mark Hamill, film and voice actor (Star Wars)
 September 27
 Jim Shooter, and illustrator 
 David Starobin, guitarist, producer, and director

October–December
 October 3
 Bernard Cooper, fiction writer
 Harold McGee, writer on food science and history
 Keb' Mo', African American blues musician
 Kathryn D. Sullivan, astronaut
 Dave Winfield, baseball player
 October 7 – John Mellencamp, heartland rock singer-songwriter and instrumentalist
 October 11 – Jon Miller, sports announcer
 October 18
 Mike Antonovich, ice hockey player and executive
 Pam Dawber, screen actress
 Terry McMillan, novelist
 October 25 – Richard Lloyd, rock guitarist
 October 26 – Bootsy Collins, African American funk singer-songwriter and bass guitarist
 October 28 – Ronnie and Donnie Galyon, conjoined twins (d. 2020)
 October 30 – Harry Hamlin, screen actor
 November 1 – Ronald Bell, musician (Kool & the Gang) (d. 2020)
 November 2 – Thomas Mallon, novelist and critic
 November 3 – Ed Murawinski, cartoonist (New York Daily News)
 November 9 – Lou Ferrigno, film actor and bodybuilder
 November 11 – Marc Summers, television host
 November 14
 Frankie Banali, rock drummer (d. 2020)
 Stephen Bishop, singer-songwriter, guitarist and actor
 November 15 – Beverly D'Angelo, actress and singer
 November 16
 Miguel Sandoval, screen actor
 Paula Vogel, playwright
 November 17
 Butch Davis, American football head coach 
 Dean Paul Martin, pop singer and screen actor (d. 1987)
 Stephen Root, screen and voice actor
 November 18 – Justin Raimondo, political activist (d. 2019)
 November 20 – Rodger Bumpass, voice actor (Squidward Tentacles on SpongeBob SquarePants)
 November 24 
 Chet Edwards, politician
 Robin Herman, writer and journalist (d. 2022)
 November 27 – Teri DeSario, disco singer-songwriter
 November 29
 Kathryn Bigelow, film director
 Roger Troutman, funk singer-songwriter and multi-instrumentalist (d. 1999)
 December 1
 Sherry Aldridge, singer
 Obba Babatundé, actor
 Jaco Pastorius, jazz fusion bass guitarist (d. 1987)
 Treat Williams, actor, writer and aviator 
 December 2 – Adrian Devine, baseball pitcher (d. 2020)
 December 4 
 Gary Rossington, guitarist and songwriter (d. 2023)
 Patricia Wettig, screen actress
 December 8 – Bill Bryson, non-fiction author
 December 10 – Johnny Rodriguez, country singer
 December 11 – Peter T. Daniels, writing systems scholar
 December 12 – Greg Lee, basketball player (d. 2022)
 December 18 
 Bobby Jones, basketball player 
 Alvin E. Roth, academic
 December 19 – Karl F. Lopker, business executive (d. 2018)
 December 31 – Tom Hamilton, hard rock bass guitarist and songwriter

Deaths

January–March
 January 2 – Richard Hart, actor (b. 1915)
 January 10 – Sinclair Lewis, novelist, recipient of Nobel Prize in Literature (b. 1885)
 January 11 – Charles Goddard, playwright and screenwriter (b. 1879)
 January 13 – Florence Kahn, Lady Beerbohm, actress, died in Italy (b. 1878)
 January 18 – Jack Holt, film actor (b. 1888)
 January 22 – Karl Nessler, inventor (b. 1872 in Germany)
 January 28 – Dominic Salvatore Gentile, military pilot, killed in aviation accident (b. 1920)
 February 9 – Eddy Duchin, jazz pianist and bandleader (b. 1909)
 February 13 – Lloyd C. Douglas, novelist (b. 1877)
 February 16 – Tommy Gagliano, mobster (b. 1883)
 February 18 – Lyman Gilmore, aviation pioneer (b. 1874)
 February 22 – Alfred Lindley, Olympic rower (b. 1904)
 February 28 – Henry W. Armstrong, boxer and songwriter (b. 1879)
 March 2 – Al Taylor, film character actor (b. 1887)
 March 8 – Charles Coleman, film character actor (b. 1885 in Australia)
 March 14 – Val Lewton, film producer and screenwriter (b. 1904)
 March 25
 Eddie Collins, baseball player (Chicago White Sox) (b. 1887)
 Oscar Micheaux, African American filmmaker (b. 1884)
 March 31 – Ralph Forbes, actor (b. 1896 in the United Kingdom)

April–June
 April 4 – George Albert Smith, President of the Church of Jesus Christ of Latter-day Saints (b. 1870)
 April 11 – Joe King, film actor (b. 183)
 April 19 – Frank Hopkins, horseman and soldier (b. 1865)
 April 23 – Charles G. Dawes, 30th Vice President of the United States, recipient of Nobel Peace Prize (b. 1865)
 May 5 – Eddie Dunn, comedy film actor (b. 1896)
 May 7 – Warner Baxter, film actor (b. 1889)
 May 8 – Pat Hartigan, film actor and director (b. 1881)
 May 20 – Marguerite Merington, author (b. 1857 in the United Kingdom)
 May 24 – Thomas N. Heffron, silent film director (b. 1872)
 May 29 – Fanny Brice, entertainer (b. 1891)
 June 4 – Serge Koussevitzky, orchestral conductor (b. 1874 in Russia)
 June 9 – Mayo Methot, actress (b. 1904)
 June 21 – Charles Dillon Perrine, astronomer, discoverer of two moons of Jupiter (b. 1867)
 June 27 – David Warfield, stage actor (b. 1866)

July–September
 July 9 – Harry Heilmann, baseball player (Detroit Tigers) (b. 1894)
 July 23 – Robert J. Flaherty, filmmaker (b. 1884)
 August 3 – Bee Ho Gray, Wild West star, silent film actor and vaudeville performer (b. 1885)
 August 6 – Anthony Brancato, criminal (b. 1914)
 August 14
 Bertha Gifford, serial killer (b. 1871)
 William Randolph Hearst, newspaper magnate (b. 1863)
 August 28 – Robert Walker, film actor (b. 1918)
 September 7 – John Sloan, painter and etcher (b. 1871)
 September 17 – Jimmy Yancey, pianist and composer (b. 1898)
 September 18 – Gelett Burgess, art critic and humorist (b. 1866)
 September 29 – Thomas Cahill, soccer coach (b. 1864)

October–December
 October 4 – Henrietta Lacks, African American originator of the HeLa cell line (b. 1920)
 October 6 – Otto Fritz Meyerhof, physician and biochemist, recipient of Nobel Prize in Physiology or Medicine (b. 1884 in Germany)
 October 24
 Al Baker, magician (b. 1874)
 Clarence Stewart Williams, admiral (b. 1863)
 October 26 – William S. Finucane, businessman and politician (b. 1888)
 November 3 – Richard Wallace, film director (b. 1894)
 November 15 – Robert Elliott, screen character actor (b. 1879)
 November 25 – Harry B. Liversedge, general (b. 1894)
 December 5 – Shoeless Joe Jackson, baseball player (Chicago White Sox) (b. 1889)
 December 6 – Harold Ross, editor, founder of The New Yorker (b. 1892)
 December 12 – Bill Patton, film actor (b. 1894)
 December 19 – Barton Yarborough, radio actor (b. 1900)

See also
 List of American films of 1951
 Timeline of United States history (1950–1969)

References

External links
 

 
1950s in the United States
United States
United States
Years of the 20th century in the United States